= Gwongeumseong =

Fortress in South Korea

Coordinates: 38.1637°N 128.4850°E

Gwongeumseong

Gwongeumseong (Korean: 권금성; Hanja: 權金城; MR: Kwŏn'gŭmsŏng), also known as Seoraksan Fortress or Onggeumsan Mountain Castle, is an ancient mountain fortress located in Seoraksan National Park, Sokcho, Gangwon Province, South Korea. Situated approximately 800 meters above sea level, it offers panoramic views of Seoraksan Mountain and the East Sea.

== History ==
The exact date of construction is unclear, but it is believed to have been built during the Goryeo Dynasty (918-1392). Local legend attributes its construction to two generals named Gwon and Kim, who sought refuge from war. Some sources suggest it was built around the 13th century, possibly during the reign of King Gojong (r. 1213–1259), to serve as a military stronghold against foreign invasions, particularly the Mongols.

== Features ==
The fortress utilizes the natural rocky terrain as part of its defensive structure. Today, only remnants of the original fortress remain, including traces of stone walls. The site is characterized by its expansive stone floor and the surrounding rock formations.
